This is a list of schools in Rutland, England.

State-funded schools

Primary schools 

 Brooke Hill Academy, Oakham
 Catmose Primary, Oakham
 Cottesmore Academy, Cottesmore
 Edith Weston Academy, Edith Weston
 Empingham CE Primary School, Empingham
 English Martyrs' RC Primary School, Oakham
 Exton and Greeton CE Primary School, Exton
 Great Casterton CE Primary School, Great Casterton
 Ketton CE Primary School, Ketton
 Langham CE Primary School, Langham
 Leighfield Primary School, Uppingham
 Oakham CE Primary School, Oakham
 Ryhall CE Academy, Ryhall
 St Mary and St John CE Primary School, North Luffenham
 St Nicholas CE Primary School, Cottesmore
 Uppingham CE Primary School, Uppingham
 Whissendine CE Primary School, Whissendine

Secondary schools 
 Casterton College, Great Casterton
 Catmose College, Oakham
 Uppingham Community College, Uppingham

Special and alternative schools 
 The Parks School, Oakham

Further education 
 Harington School
 Rutland County College

Independent schools

Primary and preparatory schools 
 Brooke Priory School, Oakham

Senior and all-through schools 
 Oakham School, Oakham
 Uppingham School, Uppingham

Special and alternative schools 
 The Shires, Stretton
 The Shires , Oakham
 Wilds Lodge School, Empingham

Rutland
Schools in Rutland
Lists of buildings and structures in Rutland